The 5th Magritte Awards ceremony, presented by the Académie André Delvaux, honored the best films of 2014 in Belgium and took place on 7 February 2015 at the Square in the historic site of Mont des Arts, Brussels beginning at 7:50 p.m. CET. During the ceremony, the Académie André Delvaux presented Magritte Awards in 21 categories. The ceremony was televised in Belgium by BeTV. Actor François Damiens presided the ceremony, while Charlie Dupont hosted the show for the first time.

The nominees for the 5th Magritte Awards were announced on 7 January 2015. Films with the most nominations were Two Days, One Night with nine, followed by Not My Type with eight. The winners were announced during the awards ceremony on 7 February 2015. Two Days, One Night won three awards, including Best Film and Best Director for Jean-Pierre and Luc Dardenne. Other multiple winners were Marina and Not My Type also with three awards each, and The Marchers with two.

Winners and nominees

Best Film
 Two Days, One Night (Deux jours, une nuit)
 Henri
 The Marchers (La Marche)
 Not My Type (Pas son genre)
 Scouting for Zebras (Les Rayures du zèbre)

Best Director
 Jean-Pierre and Luc Dardenne – Two Days, One Night (Deux jours, une nuit)
 Lucas Belvaux – Not My Type (Pas son genre)
 Nabil Ben Yadir – The Marchers (La Marche)
 Yolande Moreau – Henri

Best Flemish Film
 Marina
 I'm the Same, I'm an Other
 Labyrinthus
 Welcome Home

Best Foreign Film in Coproduction
 Minuscule: Valley of the Lost Ants (Minuscule - La vallée des fourmis perdues)
 Playing Dead (Je fais le mort)
 A Promise 
 Violette

Best Screenplay
 Not My Type (Pas son genre) – Lucas Belvaux Henri – Yolande Moreau
 The Marchers (La Marche) – Nabil Ben Yadir
 Two Days, One Night (Deux jours, une nuit) – Jean-Pierre and Luc Dardenne

Best Actor
 Fabrizio Rongione – Two Days, One Night (Deux jours, une nuit)
 François Damiens – Playing Dead (Je fais le mort)
 Bouli Lanners – Lulu in the Nude (Lulu femme nue)
 Benoît Poelvoorde – Scouting for Zebras (Les Rayures du zèbre)

Best Actress
 Émilie Dequenne – Not My Type (Pas son genre)
 Manah Depauw – Welcome Home
 Pauline Étienne – Tokyo Fiancée
 Déborah François – Maestro
 Ben Riga – I'll Bury You (Je te survivrai)

Best Supporting Actor
 Jérémie Renier – Saint Laurent
 François Damiens – Suzanne
 Olivier Gourmet – The Marchers (La Marche)
 David Murgia – I'll Bury You (Je te survivrai)

Best Supporting Actress
 Lubna Azabal – The Marchers (La Marche)
 Anne Coesens – Not My Type (Pas son genre)
 Christelle Cornil – Two Days, One Night (Deux jours, une nuit)
 Catherine Salée – Two Days, One Night (Deux jours, une nuit)

Most Promising Actor
 Marc Zinga – Scouting for Zebras (Les Rayures du zèbre)
 Corentin Lobet – Playing Dead (Je fais le mort)
 Benjamin Ramon – Tokyo Anyway
 Matteo Simoni – Marina

Most Promising Actress
 Ambre Grouwels – Baby Balloon
 Evelien Bosmans – Marina
 Hande Kodja – Rosenn
 Emilie Maréchal – Tokyo Anyway

Best Cinematography
 The Strange Color of Your Body's Tears (L'Étrange Couleur des larmes de ton corps) – Manuel Dacosse The Taste of Blueberries (Le Goût des myrtilles) – Philippe Guilbert and Virginie Saint-Martin
 Tokyo Fiancée – Hichame Alaouié

Best Sound
 Not My Type (Pas son genre) – Henri Morelle and Luc Thomas The Strange Color of Your Body's Tears (L'Étrange Couleur des larmes de ton corps) – Dan Bruylandt, Mathieu Cox, and Olivier Thys
 Two Days, One Night (Deux jours, une nuit) – Benoît De Clerck and Thomas Gauder

Best Production Design
 Marina – Hubert Pouille The Strange Color of Your Body's Tears (L'Étrange Couleur des larmes de ton corps) – Julia Irribarria
 Two Days, One Night (Deux jours, une nuit) – Igor Gabriel

Best Costume Design
 Marina – Catherine Marchand The Strange Color of Your Body's Tears (L'Étrange Couleur des larmes de ton corps) – Jackye Fauconnier
 Tokyo Fiancée – Claire Dubien

Best Original Score
 Puppylove – Soldout (David Baboulis and Charlotte Maison) Henri – Wim Willaert
 Not My Type (Pas son genre) – Frédéric Vercheval

Best Editing
 The Marchers (La Marche) – Damien Keyeux Not My Type (Pas son genre) – Ludo Troch
 Two Days, One Night (Deux jours, une nuit) – Marie-Hélène Dozo

Best Short Film
 La Bûche de Noel
 En attendant le dégel
 Foreign Bodies (Les Corps étrangers)
 La Part de l'ombre

Best Documentary Film
 When I Will Be Dictator (Quand je serai dictateur)
 L'Âge de raison, le cinéma des frères Dardenne
 Rwanda, la vie après
 Waiting for August

Honorary Magritte Award
 Pierre Richard

Audience Award for Best First Feature Film
 I'll Bury You (Je te survivrai)
 Marbie, star de Couillu-les-Deux-Églises
 Vertigo of Possibilities (Le Vertige des possibles)

Films with multiple nominations and awards

The following twelve films received multiple nominations.

Nine: Two Days, One Night
Eight: Not My Type
Six: The Marchers
Five: Marina
Four: Henri, The Strange Color of Your Body's Tears
Three: I'll Bury You, Playing Dead, Scouting for Zebras, Tokyo Fiancée
Two: Tokyo Anyway, Welcome Home

The following four films received multiple awards.
 Three: Two Days, One Night, Marina and Not My Type
 Two: The Marchers

See also

 40th César Awards
 20th Lumières Awards
 2014 in film

References

External links
 
 
 5th Magritte Awards at AlloCiné

2015
2014 film awards
2015 in Belgium